Borgia is a historical drama television series created by Tom Fontana for Canal+, ZDF, ORF, and Sky Italia. The show recounts the Borgia family's rise to power and subsequent domination of the Papal States during the Renaissance.

Borgia debuted in Italy on Sky Cinema 1 on 10 July 2011. It was since renewed for a second season, which premiered in France on Canal+ on 18 March 2013. A third and final season premiered in France on Canal+ on 15 September 2014. The series finale aired in France on Canal+ on 27 October 2014 as the 38th episode overall.

Production
The series is produced by Atlantique Productions, a subsidiary of Lagardère Entertainment, for French premium-pay TV Canal+ in association with EOS Entertainment, and was filmed in the Czech Republic and Italy. Czech production was held by company Etic films. International distribution is handled by Beta Film GmbH. Season 3 was filmed between 27 May 2013 and 27 January 2014.

International production
Despite being a French-German-Czech-Italian production, the whole setup is very international. The series creator, producer, and lead writer Tom Fontana, as well as other writers including Sean Whitesell, Gina Gionfriddo, and Larry Cohen are all American. Season 2 sees French writer Audrey Fouché join the writing team.

The directors come from several different parts of Europe: Oliver Hirschbiegel and Christoph Schrewe are German, Dearbhla Walsh is Irish, Metin Hüseyin is British and Thomas Vincent is French. Each director is in charge of directing at least two consecutive episodes before handing the series over to a new director.

The main character, Rodrigo Borgia, is portrayed by American actor John Doman. The rest of the cast hails from the United Kingdom, France, Germany, Italy and the Czech Republic, but the Republic of Ireland, Denmark, and Spain and several other countries are also represented.

Cast and characters

Main
 John Doman as Cardinal Rodrigo Borgia / Pope Alexander VI
 Mark Ryder as Cesare Borgia
 Stanley Weber as Juan Borgia and Francesco Borgia (Season 1, guest seasons 2-3)
 Isolda Dychauk as Lucrezia Borgia
 Marta Gastini as Giulia Farnese
 Diarmuid Noyes as Cardinal Alessandro Farnese
 Art Malik as Francesc Gacet, Rodrigo Borgia's secretary
 Assumpta Serna as Vannozza Cattanei
 Christian McKay as Cardinal Ascanio Sforza (seasons 1–2)
 Scott Winters as Cardinal Raffaele Riario-Sansoni
 Dejan Čukić as Cardinal Giuliano della Rovere

Recurring

 Victor Schefé as Johann Burchard
 Paul Brennen as Agapito Geraldini, Cesare's secretary
 Andrea Sawatzki as Adriana de Mila, Lucrezia's governess
 Michael Fitzgerald as Cardinal Oliviero Carafa
 Miroslav Táborský as Cardinal Giambattista Orsini
 Alejandro Albarracín as Alfonso di Calabria
 Sean Campion as Virginio Orsini
 Karel Dobrý as Cardinal Giovanni Colonna
 Andrew Hawley as Alfonso d'Este
 Predrag Bjelac as Cardinal Francesco Piccolomini
 Nicolás Belmonte as Shahzadeh Djem
 Adam Misík as Goffredo Borgia
 Raimund Wallisch as Alfonso II of Naples
 Richard Southgate as Marcantonio Colonna
 Marc Duret as Cardinal Guillaume Briçonnet
 Petr Vanek as Miguel de Corella
 Sebastian Urzendowsky as Cardinal Juan Borgia Lanzol
 Manuel Rubey as Giovanni Sforza
 John Bradley West as Giovanni de' Medici
 Josef Jelínek as Cardinal Federico Sanseverino
 Tereza Voříšková as Fiametta Michaelis, Cesare's lover
 Josef Badalec as Cardinal Pedro Luis Borgia Lanzol
 Joseph Beattie as King Louis XII of France
 Paloma Bloyd as Princess Carlotta d'Aragona
 Rafael Cebrián as Rodrigo Borgia Lanzol, 'el pequeño'
 Matt Di Angelo as Cardinal Francesco Alidosi
 Peter Hosking as Cardinal Giovanni Battista Savelli
 Babsie Steger as Giovanna Farnese

Guest starring

 Tom Wlaschiha as Philip of Habsburg
 Vadim Glowna as Cardinal Jorge da Costa
 Mónica Lopera as Maria Enriquez de Luna
 Jiri Madl as Francesco Remolino d'Ilerda
 Eliska Krenková as Sancia of Squillace
 Scott Cleverdon as Gonzalo Fernández de Córdoba
 Davide Lipari as Sigismondo d'Este
 Alexandra Oppo as Isabella d'Este
 César Domboy as Guy de Laval
 Bohdan Petrovic Esek as Cardinal Francesco Borgia
 Michael Bilington as Orsino Orsini Migliorati
 Udo Kier as Pope Innocent VIII
 Dave Legeno as Guidobaldo da Montefeltro
 Jirí Ornest as Cardinal Ardicino della Porta
 Marek Vasut as Fabrizio Colonna
 Amber Rose Revah as Maacah bat Talmai, Juan's lover
 Simon Larvaron as King Charles VIII of France
 David Atrakchi as Yves D'Allegre, French captain
 Marco Cassini as Pietro Bembo
 Antoine Cholet as Cardinal Georges D'Amboise
 Thibaut Evrard as Niccolò Machiavelli
 Josef Karas as Domenico Doria, Papal Guard commander
 Valentina Cervi as Caterina Sforza
 Iain Glen as Girolamo Savonarola
 Richard McCabe as King Frederick IV of Naples
 Daisy Lewis as Maria Diaz Garlon, Cesare's lover
 Rudolf Martin as Franceschetto Cybo
 Javier Godino as Dionigi di Naldo
 Paul Hamy as Simon d'Auxerre
 Lorenzo Richelmy as Sidonius Grimani
 Luka Peroš as Imola man
 Ellie Darcey-Alden as Felice della Rovere

Episodes

Season 1 – Borgia: Faith and Fear (2011) 
(March 1492 – June 1493)

Season 2 – Borgia: Rules of Love, Rules of War (2013) 
(February 1494 – September 1494)

Season 3 – Borgia: Triumph and Oblivion (2014) 
(1495 – 1507)

The third season premiered on Netflix on 1 November 2014.

See also 
 2011 in Italian television
 Television in Italy
 2013 in French television
 Television in France

References

External links 
 
 Lagardère Entertainment and Canal+ Press Release March 2009

 Official French website
 Article about Borgia on Austrian public TV website "ORF"

Historical television series
Television series set in the 15th century
Television series set in the 16th century
German drama television series
ZDF original programming
House of Borgia
Monarchy in fiction
Incest in television
Television shows set in Italy
Television shows set in Vatican City
2011 French television series debuts
2011 German television series debuts
2014 German television series endings
2010s Italian television series
2010s French drama television series
Czech drama television series
Television shows about Catholicism
2011 Czech television series debuts
2014 Czech television series endings
Films shot in the Czech Republic
Films about popes
Cultural depictions of Cesare Borgia
Cultural depictions of Lucrezia Borgia
Cultural depictions of Pope Alexander VI
Cultural depictions of Niccolò Machiavelli
Cultural depictions of Girolamo Savonarola
Cultural depictions of Caterina Sforza
Television series created by Tom Fontana
Canal+ original programming
Sky Atlantic (Italy) television programmes
Czech historical television series
Czech biographical television series